Forest Guerrillas was a Finnic resistance movement formed by some of the inhabitants of the parishes of Repola and Porajärvi, in addition to several White Guard volunteers after their territory was ceded to Bolshevist Russia in the Treaty of Tartu of 1920. The conflict is known as the East Karelian Uprising. The 2,000  forces managed to capture large parts of East Karelia during their rebellion against their Russian rulers in 1921, aiming to unite these areas with the newly formed Republic of Finland. Ultimately, however, in 1922 the rebel forces withdrew into Finland.

See also 
 Forest Brothers
 Cursed soldiers
 Heimosodat

Finnish Civil War
History of Karelia
Military history of the Soviet Union
Military units and formations of the Russian Civil War
Paramilitary organisations based in Finland
Anti-communist organizations
Finland–Soviet Union relations